Okhli-ye Bala (also Romanized as Okhlī-ye Bālā) is a village in Daland Rural District, in the Central District of Ramian County, Golestan Province, Iran. At the 2006 census, its population was 348, in 82 families.

References 

Populated places in Ramian County